"When a Man Loves a Woman" is a song by American singer-songwriter Jody Watley, released as the final single from her fourth album, Intimacy (1993). The song peaked at number 11 on the US Billboard R&B Singles Chart and number 33 on the UK Singles Chart, making it Watley's first top-40 hit in the UK since "Friends" in 1989.

Critical reception
Bill Speed and John Martinucci from the Gavin Report described the song as "a monologue observing key elements of an unconditional relationship between a man and a woman."

Track listings
 US cassette maxi-single
 Album version
 Remix version
 D.J.'s club Mix
 Instrumental version

 UK CD single
 "When a Man Loves a Woman" (radio mix)
 "When a Man Loves a Man" (BBG Deep mix edit)
 "When a Woman Loves a Woman" (BBG Deep mix edit)
 "Ecstasy" (B.Y.C. 12-inch)

Charts

Weekly charts

Year-end charts

Release history

References

Jody Watley songs
1993 songs
1994 singles
MCA Records singles
Songs written by Jody Watley